is a passenger railway station located in the town of Taiji, Higashimuro District, Wakayama Prefecture, Japan, operated by West Japan Railway Company (JR West).

Lines

Station layout
The station consists of one side platform serving a single bi-directional track. The platform is located high on an embankment and is connected by stairs to the station building. The station is unattended.

History
Taiji Station opened on July 18, 1935. With the privatization of the Japan National Railways (JNR) on April 1, 1987, the station came under the aegis of the West Japan Railway Company.

Passenger statistics
In fiscal 2019, the station was used by an average of 99 passengers daily (boarding passengers only).

Surrounding Area
 Roadside station Taiji
 Taiji Municipal Parking Lot
Taiji Town Hall
Taiji Elementary School

See also
List of railway stations in Japan

References

External links

 Taiji Station (West Japan Railway) 

Railway stations in Wakayama Prefecture
Railway stations in Japan opened in 1935
Taiji, Wakayama